Volodymyr Kostiuk (born 25 June 2003) is a Ukrainian artistic gymnast who competed at the inaugural Junior World Championships.

Career

Junior

2019 
Kostiuk was selected to represent Ukraine at the inaugural junior World Championships alongside Nazar Chepurnyi and Illia Kovtun.  Together they finished second as a team behind Japan.

Kostiuk next competed at the European Youth Olympic Festival in Baku, Azerbaijan, again alongside Chepurnyi and Kovtun.  They won gold as a team and individually Kostiuk won silver on parallel bars and bronze on pommel horse.

2020 
Kostiuk competed at the 2020 European Championships held in Mersin, Turkey.  While there he helped the Ukrainian junior team win gold.  Individually he won silver in the all-around behind compatriot Illia Kovtun and won silver on rings and bronze on horizontal bar.

Senior

2021 
Kostiuk turned senior in 2021 and made his senior international debut at the 2021 European Championships; he finished seventh in the all-around.

2022 
About a month after Russia invaded Ukraine, Kostiuk was drafted into the Armed Forces of Ukraine.

Competitive history

References 

Living people
2003 births
People from Dnipro
Ukrainian male artistic gymnasts
Medalists at the Junior World Artistic Gymnastics Championships
21st-century Ukrainian people